Condor agate was discovered and named by Luis de los Santos in 1993. It is found in the mountains near San Rafael, in Mendoza Province, Argentina. This agate exhibits colorful bands and patterns, and has become a popular stone among collectors and jewelry designers.

Mining 

In the early days of condor agate collecting, a typical month of effort would yield 1 ton of good agates. Currently, excavation is required to find the agates, so an extra effort is needed to supply the ever growing demand for these gems.  Initially, the agates were found scattered loose over the landscape and were readily harvested in quantity. Today, surface collecting is no longer prolific, so these agates are collected from shallow diggings in the cold agate fields in Mendoza province, Argentina.

References 

Pabian, Roger, et al. "Agates. Treasures of the Earth". Buffalo, New York, Firefly Books, 2006 
Faith E. Riesen, "Rock & Gem Magazine, Condor agate", Ventura, California, Miller Magazines, March 1993
Bob Jones, "Rock & Gem Magazine, South American Condor agate", Ventura, California, Miller Magazines, September 1995
Si & Ann Frazier, "Lapidary Journal, Soaring from Patagonia, Condor agate", December 1996, Interweave Magazines, Loveland, Colorado

Agates